Caladenia longicauda is a species of plant in the orchid family Orchidaceae and is endemic to the south-west of Western Australia. It is distinguished by its large leaf and by its up to five large, white flowers which have drooping sepals and petals with long, thickish brown "tails".

Description
The flowers are mostly white except for a few red markings and reddish stripes on the backs of the petals and sepals. The petals are similar to the sepals but slightly shorter and narrower. The middle part of the labellum has the longest teeth on its edge, the teeth red with hooked white tips. The front part of the labellum curves downwards, with the teeth becoming shorter. There are between four and eight rows of calli along the central part of the labellum, the calli pale to dark red and club-shaped. The fruit is a non-fleshy, dehiscent capsule containing a large number of seeds.

Taxonomy and naming
Caladenia longicauda was first formally described by John Lindley in 1840 and the description was published in A Sketch of the Vegetation of the Swan River Colony. The specific epithet (longicauda) is derived from the Latin words longus meaning "long" and cauda meaning "tail".

The names of fourteen subspecies of C. longicauda are accepted by the Australian Plant Census:

Distribution and habitat
Caladenia longicauda grows in a wide range of habitats from the Kalbarri National Park on the west coast to Israelite Bay on the south coast.

Conservation
Most subspecies of C. longicauda are classified as "Not Threatened" but subspecies extrema and insularis are classified as "Priority One" by the Western Australian Government Department of Parks and Wildlife meaning that they are known from only one or a few locations which are potentially at risk. Subspecies minima is classified as "Priority Two", meaning that it is poorly known and from only one or a few locations.

References

longicauda
Orchids of Western Australia
Endemic orchids of Australia
Plants described in 1840
Endemic flora of Western Australia